Diana Mae Sowle ( Laumer; June 19, 1930 – October 19, 2018) was an American actress. She was best known for her role as Charlie Bucket's mother in the 1971 film Willy Wonka and the Chocolate Factory.

Early life 
Born as Diana Mae Laumer in Chico, California, she was one of five siblings. She attended Chico High School, and appeared in school plays, where she became interested in drama. She graduated in 1949, and attended the University of Denver, after which she appeared in the play "The Drunkard". She did voice-over for American plays and appeared in theater in Germany.

Career

Film roles 
Diana is best known for playing Mrs. Bucket, Charlie Bucket's mother, in the 1971 film Willy Wonka & the Chocolate Factory and her performance of "Cheer Up Charlie" in that film, although her singing voice was dubbed by Diana Lee. Sowle joined the cast in Germany, where it was filmed. Apart from Chocolate Factory, her only other screen roles were cameos in Clear and Present Danger and Guarding Tess, both in 1994.

Video game 
Sowle also gave voice to "Agatha" and other characters in the 2008 video game Fallout 3.

Theatre 
She frequently performed in the long-running play Shear Madness at the Kennedy Center, portraying socialite Eleanor Shubert. Her last-known appearance was in May–June 2013. In mid-2012, she appeared in a production of Love Letters, opposite actor Larry Storch in Farmville, Virginia, to benefit the Tom Mix Rangers.

Personal life 
Sowle lived in Germany for about 20 years starting in 1960 and had other homes, including one in Maryland (in the Washington, D.C., area). She was a mother of two and grandmother of four. Her husband Bill Sowle worked for the CIA and died in 2013. She ran a free tutoring program for underprivileged children in Washington D.C. for almost a quarter-century.

Death 
Sowle died of natural causes on October 19, 2018. She was 88 years old.

Filmography

Film

Television

Video games

References

External links 
 
 Arlington National Cemetery

1930 births
2018 deaths
People from Chico, California
American film actresses
American stage actresses
20th-century American actresses
21st-century American actresses
Actresses from California